Hugo Hernán Maradona (9 May 1969 – 28 December 2021), also known as El Turco, was an Argentine football player and coach. He was the younger brother of Diego Maradona. He played as a midfielder for clubs in South America, Europe, Japan, and Canada, and was a member of the Argentina U-16 national team.

Career
In 1985, Maradona was a part of the Argentina U-16 national team's squad that competed at the U16 South American and World Championships in China. In Argentina's first round match against Congo, he scored two goals to help the team to a 4–2 win, which however was one goal short of what Argentina needed to advance past the group stage.

During 1987, Hugo Maradona was bought by Ascoli to play in the Italian Serie A championship. He played just 13 matches without scoring a goal and was sold at the end of the season to Rayo Vallecano in Spain. During 1989 he moved again, that time to Rapid Wien, and after that experience he went back to Argentina. 

In 1992, he moved to Japan to play for the PJM Futures (renamed as Tosu Futures after changing their hometown in 1994), which was aiming to promote to the newly-inaugurated J.League. After playing for Futures for three seasons, he played for Fukuoka Blux (known as Avispa Fukuoka since 1996) in the 1995 and 1996 seasons and Hokkaido Consadole Sapporo in the 1997 and 1998 seasons.

After retiring from association football as a player, Maradona lived a relatively quiet life in Argentina.

In 2004, Hugo Maradona moved part-time to Puerto Rico, where he became part of that country's association football federation's attempt to invigorate the sport among Puerto Ricans by becoming the head coach of the Puerto Rico Islanders, a team in the American USL First Division. He then moved back to Italy, working for a number of youth and amateur teams in the Naples region.

Personal life and death
Maradona was born in Lanús on 9 May 1969, as the youngest sibling of brothers Diego Maradona and Raúl Maradona, both noted footballers in their own right. His father Diego Maradona "Chitoro" (1927–2015), who worked at a chemicals factory, was of Guaraní (Indigenous) and Galician (Spanish) descent, and his mother Dalma Salvadora Franco, "Doña Tota" (1930–2011), was of Italian descent.

He died from a heart attack at his home in Monte di Procida, near Naples, on 28 December 2021, at the age of 52.

References

External links

About Hugo Maradona (Italian)

1969 births
2021 deaths
Argentine football managers
Argentine footballers
Argentine people of Guaraní descent
Argentine people of Italian descent
Argentine people of Basque descent
Ascoli Calcio 1898 F.C. players
Association football midfielders
Avispa Fukuoka players
Hokkaido Consadole Sapporo players
Deportivo Italia players
J1 League players
Japan Football League (1992–1998) players
La Liga players
Sportspeople from Buenos Aires Province
C.A. Progreso players
Puerto Rico Islanders coaches
Rayo Vallecano players
Sagan Tosu players
Serie A players
SK Rapid Wien players
Austrian Football Bundesliga players
Toronto Italia players
USL First Division coaches
Maradona family
Argentina youth international footballers
Argentine expatriate footballers
Argentine expatriate sportspeople in Italy
Expatriate footballers in Italy
Argentine expatriate sportspeople in Spain
Expatriate footballers in Spain
Argentine expatriate sportspeople in Austria
Expatriate footballers in Austria
Argentine expatriate sportspeople in Venezuela
Expatriate footballers in Venezuela
Argentine expatriate sportspeople in Uruguay
Expatriate footballers in Uruguay
Argentine expatriate sportspeople in Japan
Expatriate footballers in Japan
Argentine expatriate sportspeople in Canada
Expatriate soccer players in Canada
Argentine expatriate sportspeople in Puerto Rico
Expatriate football managers in Puerto Rico